4A or IV-A may refer to :

 4A, Ararat International Airlines' IATA airline designator
 4A, a series of Toyota A engine produced by Toyota Motor Corporation (1982-2002)
 4A, the production code for the 1974–75 Doctor Who serial Robot
 4A Centre for Contemporary Asian Art, Sydney, Australia
 4A Engine, a video game engine developed by 4A Games
 4A Games, a video game development company in Ukraine
 Calabarzon or Region IV-A, a province in Philippines
 Pixel 4a, an Android smartphone 
 Vermont Route 4A, a highway in Vermont, U.S.

See also
 4A/OP, a radiative transfer model for the infrared
 Long March 4A, a Chinese rocket
 Stalag IV-A, a German prisoner of war camp
 TI-99/4A, a 1981 home computer
 AAAA (disambiguation)
 A4 (disambiguation)
 Iva (disambiguation)